The name Rosalie has been used for two tropical cyclones in the Eastern Pacific Ocean:

 Tropical Storm Rosalie (1970)
 Tropical Storm Rosalie (1974)

Pacific hurricane set index articles